In Greek mythology, Hippe (Ancient Greek: Ἵππη; English translation: "mare (horse)"), also known as Melanippe (Μελανίππη) or Euippe (Εὐίππη), was the daughter of the Centaur Chiron and Chariclo. She was seduced by, and bore a daughter, Melanippe or Arne, to Aeolus, and was ashamed to tell her father. Artemis took pity on her and, according to one account, turned her into the constellation Pegasus originally called the Horse.

Note

References
 Hard, Robin (2015), Eratosthenes and Hyginus: Constellation Myths, With Aratus's Phaenomena, Oxford University Press, 2015. .

Women in Greek mythology
Thessalian characters in Greek mythology
Thessalian mythology